The 2019 Shanghai Greenland Shenhua season was Shanghai Greenland Shenhua's 16th season in the Chinese Super League and 57th overall in the Chinese top flight. They also competed in the Chinese FA Cup, defeating Shandong Luneng Taishan in the two-legged final by an aggregate score of 3–1.

Season events
Spanish coach Quique Sánchez Flores was named as the new head coach of the club on 25 December 2018. He replaced Wu Jingui, who took over as sporting director after steering Shenhua to victory in the Chinese FA Cup in 2017.

Squad

First team squad

Source：

Reserve squad

Transfers and loans

Transfers in

Transfers out

Loans out

Friendlies

Pre-season

Competitions

Chinese Super League

League table

Results summary

Results by round

Matches

Chinese FA Cup

Squad statistics

Appearances and goals

|-
|colspan="14"|Players who away from the club on loan:
|-
|colspan="14"|Players who left Shanghai Greenland Shenhua during the season:
|}

Goal scorers

Assists

Disciplinary Record

Notes

References

External links
Official Website

Shanghai Shenhua F.C. seasons
Shanghai Greenland Shenhua F.C.